Fighting the Forces: What's at Stake in Buffy the Vampire Slayer is a 2002 academic publication relating to the fictional Buffyverse established by TV series, Buffy and Angel.

Book description

The book looks at the struggle to examine meaning in the television series, Buffy the Vampire Slayer. The series is examined from a variety of viewpoints, and especially the social and cultural issues dealt with by the series and their place in a wider literary context.

Contents

The chapters are grouped as follows:
 Part 1: Forces of Society and Culture: Gender, Generations, Violence, Class, Race and Religion (Chapters 1–10). 
 Part 2: Forces of Art and Imagination (Past): Vampires, Magic, and Monsters (Chapters 11–16).
 Part 3: Forces of Art and Imagination (Present): Fan Relationships, Metaphoric and Real (Chapters 17–20).

External links
Cesnur.org - Review
Phil-books.com - Review of this book
Nika-summers.com - Review
Slayage.tv - Review
Extrapolation_Review - Review (pdf web page)

Books about the Buffyverse
2002 non-fiction books